Butser may refer to 

Butser Hill
Butser Ancient Farm